Sibinia is a genus of leguminous seed weevils in the family Curculionidae. There are at least 20 described species in Sibinia.

Species
 Sibinia candidata Champion, 1903
 Sibinia caseyi Clark, 1978
 Sibinia errans (Casey, 1910)
 Sibinia fulva (LeConte, 1876)
 Sibinia hispida (Casey, 1892)
 Sibinia inermis (Casey, 1897) (huisache sibinia weevil)
 Sibinia lecontei Clark, 1978
 Sibinia maculata (LeConte, 1876)
 Sibinia mica (Casey, 1892)
 Sibinia ochreosa Casey, 1897
 Sibinia pallida (Schaeffer, 1908)
 Sibinia ruidula Clark, 1978
 Sibinia sellata 
 Sibinia seminicola Clark, 1978
 Sibinia setosa (LeConte, 1876)
 Sibinia sibinioides (Casey, 1892)
 Sibinia simplex (Casey, 1892)
 Sibinia subelliptica (Desbrochers, 1873)
 Sibinia suturalis (Schaeffer, 1908)
 Sibinia tanneri Clark, 1978
 Sibinia texana (Pierce, 1908)
 Sibinia transversa (Casey, 1897)
 Sibinia triseriata Clark, 1978
 Sibinia variegata (Casey, 1892)

References

 Alonso-Zarazaga, Miguel A., and Christopher H. C. Lyal (1999). A World Catalogue of Families and Genera of Curculionoidea (Insecta: Coleoptera) (Excepting Scotylidae and Platypodidae), 315.
 Poole, Robert W., and Patricia Gentili, eds. (1996). "Coleoptera". Nomina Insecta Nearctica: A Check List of the Insects of North America, vol. 1: Coleoptera, Strepsiptera, 41-820.

Further reading

 Arnett, R.H. Jr., M. C. Thomas, P. E. Skelley and J. H. Frank. (eds.). (2002). American Beetles, Volume II: Polyphaga: Scarabaeoidea through Curculionoidea. CRC Press LLC, Boca Raton, FL.
 Arnett, Ross H. (2000). American Insects: A Handbook of the Insects of America North of Mexico. CRC Press.
 Richard E. White. (1983). Peterson Field Guides: Beetles. Houghton Mifflin Company.

External links

 NCBI Taxonomy Browser, Sibinia

Curculioninae